Lalia may refer to:

Laila Ali, the daughter of Muhammad Ali
LALIA, the Late Antique Little Ice Age

See also
Coprolalia, involuntary utterance of obscene words
Glossolalia, vocalizing of fluent speech-like but unintelligible utterances
Echolalia, the repetition of vocalizations made by another person
Palilalia, the repetition or echoing of one's own spoken words
Colisa lalia, dwarf gourami, a fish